Vladilen is a Russian masculine given name. People with the name include:

 Vladilen Mashkovtsev (1929–1997), Russian poet, writer and journalist
 Vladilen F. Minin (born 1932), Soviet physicist
 Vladilen Nikitin (1936–2021), Soviet Russian engineer and politician
 Vladilen Volkov (born 1939), Russian politician
 Vladilen Zakharov (born 1994), Russian ice hockey player

Russian masculine given names